Bhilai Nagar railway station is a small railway station of Bhilai city, Chhattisgarh. Its code is BQR. It serves Bhilai city. The station consists of five platforms. Bhilai Nagar one of the five railway station in Bhilai city. The station lies on the main Howrah–Mumbai rail line.

References

Railway stations in Durg district
Raipur railway division
Transport in Bhilai